The National Center for Spinal Disorders is located in the 12th District of Budapest, Hungary, on Királyhágó Street. It is the only hospital in Hungary that covers virtually the entire diagnostic and treatment spectrum of spinal disorders from diagnosis and non-surgical and surgical treatments through to rehabilitation. It is financed by the National Health Insurance Fund.

History
The National Center for Spinal Disorders was part of the Orthopedic Clinic Department of Spine Surgery and Rehabilitation of the Semmelweis University of Budapest until 1995, when it was incorporated first into the Central Army Hospital and then into the Hungarian National Health Center. It subsequently became independent in 2005, under the direction of Peter Paul Varga, MD, its current director general, with charter members, Maria Ferenc, MD, rheumatologist, Gabor Jakab, MD, orthopedic surgeon, and Istvan Toth, MD, neurosurgeon. It is operated by the Buda Health Center, Ltd.

Spine care
The medical staff of the National Center for Spinal Disorders includes general-, orthopedic-, trauma-, and neuro-surgeons, rheumatologists, anesthesiologist-intensive care doctors, radiologists, psychologists, physiotherapists and others (i.e., urologists, gynecologists, neurologists, ophthalmologists, otolaryngologists, etc.) required for the complex examination, care and treatment of the spine.

Spine surgery
The National Center for Spinal Disorders has gained international recognition for its work in the following areas of spine surgery:

Spinal deformities
Spinal tumors
Spinal prostheses
Traditional spinal surgeries
Spinal disorders in the elderly
Complex diagnostics
Minimally invasive spinal surgery

Conservative treatment (non-surgical) of spinal disorders
The conservative treatment department's primary concern is the evaluation, treatment, and examination of patients not requiring surgery. Condition evaluation is the process of discovering whether a spinal disorder is the result of an activity or mechanical in origin with the evaluation result forming the basis for planning surgery or conservative treatment. The goal of conservative treatment is to alleviate pain, to return the patients to their normal activities and work as soon as possible and to increase the spine's functional and weight-bearing capacity.

Conservative treatments include: pain relief infusions, injections, joint, nerve root or spinal canal block injections, physiotherapy treatments (especially individual exercise programs), packs, psychotherapy and spine school for patient education and teaching. As part of in-hospital examination, a disease or diseases signifying other possible differential diagnostic problems or background psychosocial factors as the cause of spine or limb pain will be eliminated or confirmed.

Outpatient care
Outpatient care is available at the musculoskeletal, anesthesiological, neurological, psychological, physiotherapy, and emergency clinics.

Musculoskeletal clinic
The musculoskeletal clinic sees mostly patients with spinal disorders; however, many with diverse musculoskeletal problems requiring help in general orthopedics or traumatology are also treated in this clinic.

Physiotherapy clinic
Physiotherapy is an elemental part of the complex treatment of the spine wherein a doctor-therapist team works closely together for the patient's earliest recovery and rehabilitation by setting up individual therapy programs with individualized activities in order to increase the spine's functional capacity, range of movement as well as the spine's stabilizing musculature and endurance. With the training exercises performed daily as directed, the patient will be able to return to his or her regular daily activities (work, sports, leisure) without complaints.

Anesthesiological clinic
The anesthesiological examination is an elemental and crucial part of pre-surgical preparation performed by trained and experienced professionals.

Neurological clinic
The neurological clinic sees patients who, for differential diagnosis reasons, require organic neurological and/or complex electrophysiological examination in order to set up a diagnosis.

Radiology
The Radiology Department of the National Center for Spinal Disorders was one of the first to have a direct digital (ddR) x-ray equipment installed in Hungary. This made the entire spectrum of radiological examinations with lower radiation and no x-ray film possible. A 3D/4D ultrasound equipment has been in use since September 2005. The CT/MRI laboratory also contains a fast 4 slice multisclice CT equipment for examining every region of the body and an open MRI for patients with claustrophobia. Aside from the examination of the skull and the spine, the equipment is excellent for diagnosing musculoskeletal abnormalities, joints and sports injuries.

Psychotherapy
The Psychosomatic clinic was established in 2010 by Noemi Csaszar, PhD and Prof. Emoke Bagdy, PhD to treat chronic bodily afflictions. Noemi Csaszar, the group's director, has been working in psychotherapy for the past fifteen years and teaching psychotherapy methods for several years. The Psychotherapy Department has worked out a system whereby beginning psychological problems can be diagnosed thus averting stress-related physical-psychological problems.

International contacts
The National Center for Spinal Disorders plays an important part in the international spine care circles. The medical staff is very active in both national and international spine organizations both as lecturers and invited guests and the institution itself is a member of the international spine society AOSpine with Peter Paul Varga, MD director in Hungary. The center is also the organizer and host of the yearly held Bologna-Budapest International Spine Conference.

Research and development
Internationally registered research and development is conducted through the Research and Development Department where PhD undergraduate students, doctors, physiotherapists and research assistants work on their projects. The research focuses on degenerative spine disorders and molecular biology, biomechanics and clinical questions regarding tumours of the spine. The research is mostly funded through grants (OTKA [The Hungarian Scientific Research Fund], European Union, Eurospine, AOSpine, etc.). The research results are published in international medical journals and presented at both national and international conferences.

Social responsibility
Prevention and patient information are of prime concern. Under the direction of Annamaria Somhegyi, MD, the director of prevention, the institute has been in close cooperation with the Hungarian Spine Society since 1995 in furthering their posture correction and prevention program in schools. Prevention is also part of the conservative treatment in the hospital.

Directors
 Peter Paul Varga, MD, Director General, Spine Surgery, Orthopedic Surgery
 Kornel Papik, MD, administrative director, Orthopedic Surgery
 Zoltan Hoffer, MD, Spine Surgery, Orthopedic Surgery
 Gabor Jakab, MD, Director of Science and Education, Spine Surgery, Orthopedic Surgery
 Milica Urosevics, MD, Director of Anesthesiology
 Istvan Toth, MD, Spine Surgery, Traumatology, Neurosurgery
 Somhegyi Annamária, MD, PhD, Director of Prevention, Rheumatology

References

Sources
National Center for Spinal Disorders – Introduction
National Center for Spinal Disorders, an affiliate of the Buda Health Center, Ltd.
ittlakunk.hu
National Center for Spinal Disorders on gerinces.hu
National Center for Spinal Disorders on AOSpine Foundation's website

1995 establishments in Hungary
Hospitals established in 1995
Hospitals in Hungary
Buildings and structures in Budapest
Organisations based in Budapest